The Great Escape was a music festival held at Newington Armory, located within Sydney Olympic Park that took place in 2006 and 2007. Initially held over the Easter long weekend for the first two events, in 2008 it was announced the festival would take place on the Labour Day weekend, however the event was cancelled 2 months from the date due to poor ticket sales . It evolved from the 2005 Cockatoo Island Music Festival. The music and other attractions run over three full days (Good Friday to Easter Sunday in 2006–07), with some patrons camping from Thursday evening to Monday morning. Punters could attend either for the full weekend camping, purchase a 3-day pass and commute each day or attend a single day. Many acts also played the East Coast Blues & Roots Music Festival the same weekend, however The Great Escape line-up is more diverse featuring pop, hip hop, electronic and rock acts that would not fit into a Blues and Roots line-up. In addition to musical acts, there is also a wide range of other features such as comedy acts, bingo and trivia, conspiracy theory talks and yoga. There is no immediate future for the Great Escape at this point, but organisers are confident it will be resurrected in the near future.

Artist lineups
Friday 14 April 2006

Saturday 15 April 2006

Sunday 16 April 2006

Friday 6 April 2007

Saturday 7 April 2007

Sunday 8 April 2007

Gogol Bordello were advertised to play but were forced to cancel their Australian tour when visa issues prevented some members entering the country. Johnny G & The E Types played in their allotted time.

2008
The announced 2008 event featured a line-up which included Supergrass, Black Francis, Paul Kelly, Conor Oberst & The Mystic Valley Band, Peter Combe, Ladytron, Faker & The Panics, but it was called off on 8 August, just days after single day passes were sold in addition to weekend passes.

External links
 http://www.thegreatescape.net.au/

Music festivals in Australia
Recurring events established in 2006